Peirson is a given name and surname. Notable people with the name include:

Given name
Peirson Frank (1881–1951), British civil engineer and surveyor
Peirson Mitchell Hall (1894–1979), head of the U.S. Selective Service System for Los Angeles in 1941, federal District Court judge 1942–1979
Henry Peirson Harland (1876–1945), unionist politician in Northern Ireland

Surname
Francis Peirson (1757–1781), British Army officer who served during the American War of Independence
Jimmy Peirson (born 1992), Australian cricketer
Johnny Peirson (1925–2021), Canadian ice hockey player
Lydia Jane Wheeler Peirson (1802–1862), American poet
Robert Peirson (1821–1891), English astronomer and theoretical physicist
Robert Peirson (priest) (died 1805), English priest
Samuel Peirson (c. 1647 – 1720), English organist

See also
Pierson (surname)
Pearson (surname)
Pirson